The 2001 Formula Volkswagen Germany supported by ZF Sachs was the second season of the Formula Volkswagen Germany. All drivers competed in Volkswagen powered, Dunlop shod Reynard chassis. For 2002 the cars got an aerodynamic upgrade. Also the race format was changed from one race per weekend to two races per weekend.

Calendar and results

Final standings

References

2002 in German motorsport